HESH or Hesh may refer to:

Places
 Sharm El Sheikh International Airport,  is an international airport  in Sharm El Sheikh, Egypt

Science and technology
High-explosive squash head, a type of explosive ammunition